Speed-flying and speed riding are advanced disciplines of paragliding that use a small, high-performance paraglider wing to quickly descend heights such as mountains. Speed flying and speed riding are very similar sports; speed flying is when the speed wing is foot-launched, while speed riding is a winter sport done on skis.

Comparison to paragliding and parachuting 

Speed flying is a hybrid sport that combines elements of paragliding and parachuting to create a new sport. Like paragliding, speed flying is done by launching from a slope with the wing overhead, already inflated by the incoming air. The main difference between speed flying and paragliding, is that speed flying is meant to create a fast, thrilling ride close to the slope, while the point of paragliding is usually to maintain a longer, gentler flight. The fast landing technique for speed wings is similar to that used in parachuting. However, parachuting or skydiving is done from a plane or fixed object (BASE jumping), and the wing is designed to arrest the free fall. Newer designs of hybrid-wings (also called mini-wings) are now being produced to allow a high speed "hike and fly" from mountainous areas. They can be soared in strong laminar winds and thermalled similar to paragliders, and may also be trimmed for a more traditional speed flying descent.

History 
In the late 1970s, French mountaineers began launching parachutes from steep mountains on foot (ground launching) and with skis. Modifications to these parachutes evolved into larger, easier to launch wings now called paragliders, and parachute ground launching remained largely forgotten. However, advances in material and parachute swooping events inspired a new generation of pilots in France and America about 20 years later. Foot-launched parachute slalom course competitions known as blade running (or runner) competitions started in the Western United States in 1996 and continue with the Blade Raid since 2005. An American team of stunt parachutists expanded the sport, making stunt videos skimming mountain slopes in the Alps from 2001 to 2002. One team member opened the first 'Ground Launching School' for foot-launched parachutes in 2004 in California, US.

In 2005, a group of French pilots began experimenting with modified parachute and parafoil kite designs. One of them, Francois Bon, a paraglider test pilot, unsatisfied with foot-launched parachute performance, helped perfect the first speed wing design, the Gin Nano. This evolved into other commercial wings (between 9 and 14 square metres) designed for speed, portability, and a lower glide ratio. Today speed gliders are produced by over 30 manufacturers worldwide. France hosted the first yearly speed flying competition, "Speed Flying Pro Les Arcs", in January 2007, which continued to be dominated by pioneer speed flyer Antoine Montant until his death in 2011.

The sport has grown rapidly since its inception, particularly in France and Switzerland, with an estimated 3,000 to 5,000 speed wing pilots all over the world. Speed wing pilots have already garnered media attention with rapid descents from summits such as Aconcagua in the Andes and various peaks in the Alps. There are established flying sites all over the globe, including dedicated ski runs at several resorts in France, and over 100 instructors in around 20 different countries. The new air sport has many written forms (such as speedflying, speed-flying, speed flying, speed riding, speedriding, speed-riding, skigliding, ski-gliding, ski gliding, ski flying, ski-flying and ground launching).

The wing 

The wing itself is known as a speed glider, speed wing, or speed flyer. It has similar material to a paraglider (with a ripstop nylon fabric wing, treated with a polyurethane or silicon coating, Kevlar or Dyneema lines protected by an outer sheath, and Mylar reinforcement on the cell openings at the leading edge). However, the speed wing is only about half the size of an average paraglider (see the table below). The wing's small size and unique design give it a much smaller glide ratio making it more suitable to fly close to the slope. The smaller size also allows the wing to be flown in windier environments, and minimizes weight for hiking. The speed glider flies at speeds of 20 to 95 mph versus a paraglider's 12 to 50 mph.

It also shares characteristics with a ram-air parachute. It differs, however, because it is much lighter, more maneuverable, doesn't have a pilot chute or slider, and is not suitable for arresting free falls. The pilot can use a standing harness similar to those worn with a parachute, a strap-like sitting harness, or a protectively padded, seated harness (identical to those used with a paraglider). The speed flyer has adjustable trims on the rear riser, and sometimes the front riser. These allow the pilot to adjust the line lengths and pick the wing angle of attack best suited for the hill steepness and wind conditions.

Speed flying and speed riding require different wing characteristics because of the different glide angles and launch techniques. Speed riding pilots are able to achieve greater speeds on launch with the use of skis, and so the use of a smaller wing (typically between 7 and 10 square metres) is common, and wings tailored to this aspect of the sport typically have a steeper glide angle and long recovery arc to allow skiing on steep slopes with the wing overhead. Speed flying pilots must launch on foot, so wing sizes are typically slightly larger, although many expert speedflying pilots do routinely foot launch wings of 8 square metres or less.

Safety 
Because of the high flight speed (30–152.9 km/h or 20-95 mph), and close proximity to the slope and obstacles, injury and death are considerable risks in this sport. Over 75 pilots have suffered fatal injuries worldwide since 2006. Also, because of its small size and high wing loading, the wing responds quickly to little pilot input, which makes professional instruction very important. However, the high velocities help the glider remain pressurised and resistant to collapse even in turbulent conditions. Proper equipment such as helmets, padded harnesses, and reserve parachutes can help reduce injuries. Advanced wing and ski training, and thorough knowledge of site conditions and hazards, are imperative to practicing this sport safely.

References

External links 
 Abovethepines: website information (spot map, schools, wing reviews, weather...)
 SKIANDFLY: website information (has organised speed riding camps, workshops for beginner, intermediate and expert speed riders in France, Norway and New Zealand)
 Speedriding and speedflying spots, tips, photos, videos

Air sports
Adventure travel
Individual sports
Winter sports
Articles containing video clips